Konstantinos Galeadis (born 21 August 1999) is a Greek professional footballer who plays as a forward for Super League 2 club Karaiskakis.

Career
Born in Thessaloniki, he played with youth team of AEL. He then moved to Italy and joined Nuorese Calcio. In summer 2019 he joined FK Radnički Pirot and debuted in Serbian First League.

References

1999 births
Living people
Footballers from Thessaloniki
Greek footballers
Greek expatriate footballers
Association football midfielders
Athlitiki Enosi Larissa F.C. players
Nuorese Calcio players
Expatriate footballers in Italy
FK Radnički Pirot players
Serbian First League players
Expatriate footballers in Serbia